This is a list of libraries in Melbourne, Victoria, Australia, the second UNESCO City of Literature. Melbourne has a rich and varied books-and-reading culture and municipal councils throughout Melbourne provide funding and support for a rich network of libraries.  Membership of these libraries is free.

Community / Non-profit libraries 
Australian Lesbian and Gay Archives
Berwick Mechanics' Institute
Footscray Mechanics' Institute Inc. Library, Footscray
Melbourne Athenaeum Library
Prahran Mechanics' Institute
Melbourne Art Library

Local Government libraries
Melbourne's public library services are operated by local government municipalities through a range of grants funding and service agreements. In addition to branch libraries a number of library service providers also operate a mobile service to outer Metropolitan areas. Public Libraries Victoria is the peak body for public libraries in Victoria.

Inner City

 The City of Melbourne has libraries in Melbourne, Docklands, East Melbourne and North Melbourne.
 The City of Port Phillip has libraries in Albert Park, Emerald Hill, Middle Park, Port Melbourne and St Kilda.
 The City of Yarra has libraries in Carlton North, Collingwood, Fitzroy, Fitzroy North and Richmond.

Northern suburbs
 The City of Banyule has libraries in Ivanhoe, Rosanna and Watsonia. and is managed by Yarra Plenty Regional Library.
 The City of Darebin has libraries in Fairfield, Northcote, Preston and Reservoir.
 The City of Hume has libraries in Broadmeadows, Craigieburn, Gladstone Park, Sunbury and Tullamarine.
 The City of Moonee Valley has libraries in Ascot Vale, Avondale Heights, Flemington, Moonee Ponds and Niddrie.
 The City of Moreland has libraries in Brunswick, Brunswick West, Coburg, Fawkner and Glenroy.
 The Shire of Nillumbik has libraries in Greensborough and Eltham. and a click and collect service at Hurstbridge. It is managed by Yarra Plenty Regional Library
 The City of Whittlesea has libraries in Lalor, Mill Park, Thomastown and Whittlesea. with click and collect services at Donnybrook and Epping. It is managed by Yarra Plenty Regional Library

Eastern suburbs
 The City of Boroondara has libraries in Ashburton, Balwyn, Camberwell, Hawthorn and Kew.
 The City of Knox has libraries in Wantirna South, Boronia, Bayswater, Ferntree Gully and Rowville.
 The City of Manningham has libraries in Bulleen, Doncaster, Doncaster East and Warrandyte.
 The City of Maroondah has libraries in Croydon and Ringwood.
 The City of Whitehorse has libraries in Blackburn, Box Hill, Nunawading and Vermont South.
 The Shire of Yarra Ranges has libraries in Belgrave, Healesville, Lilydale, Montrose, Mooroolbark, Mount Evelyn and Yarra Junction.

South Eastern suburbs
 The City of Bayside has libraries in Beaumaris, Brighton, Hampton and Sandringham.
 The Shire of Cardinia has libraries in  Emerald and Pakenham.
 The City of Casey has libraries in Cranbourne, Doveton, Endeavour Hills, Hampton Park and Narre Warren
 The City of Greater Dandenong has libraries in Springvale and Dandenong.
 The City of Frankston has libraries in Frankston and Carrum Downs.
 The City of Glen Eira has libraries in Bentleigh, Carnegie, Caulfield and Elsternwick.
 The City of Kingston has libraries in Chelsea, Cheltenham, Clarinda, Dingley Village, Highett, Moorabbin, Parkdale and Patterson Lakes.
 The City of Monash has libraries in Clayton, Glen Waverley, Mount Waverley, Oakleigh and Wheelers Hill
 The Shire of Mornington Peninsula has libraries in Mornington, Rosebud, Hastings and Somerville.
 The City of Stonnington has libraries in Malvern, Malvern East, Prahran and South Yarra.

Western suburbs
 The City of Brimbank has libraries in Deer Park, Keilor, St Albans, Sunshine and Sydenham.
 The City of Hobsons Bay has libraries in  Altona, Altona Meadows, Altona North, Newport and Williamstown.
 The City of Maribyrnong has libraries in Braybrook, Footscray, Maribyrnong, West Footscray and Yarraville.
 The Shire of Melton has libraries in Melton and Caroline Springs.
 The City of Wyndham has libraries in Hoppers Crossing, Werribee, Point Cook, Wyndham Vale and Tarneit.

State Government libraries 
The State Government of Victoria maintains libraries within most Government departments and agencies as well as the through the State Library of Victoria, the principal reference and research library of the State Government.

Theological libraries 
 Mannix Library, Catholic Theological College
 St Paschal Library, Box Hill

University residential college libraries 
 Ormond College Library, The University of Melbourne
 Trinity College Library, The University of Melbourne

University libraries 
The University Library, The University of Melbourne 
Borchardt Library, La Trobe University
RMIT University Library
Monash University Library
Swinburne University of Technology Library
Victoria University Library
Deakin University Library
Federation University Library, Berwick

Special libraries
There are a large number of special libraries in Melbourne, which are embedded in corporations and organisations in the fields of law, business, professional associations, health, charitable, religious and cultural organisations. These include:

Museums Victoria library

Library sponsors, donors and foundations 
State Library of Victoria Foundation

References

External links
 Find your local library

Libraries
Libraries
Libraries
Melbourne